Spirit to Soar is a Canadian documentary film, directed by Tanya Talaga and Michelle Derosier and released in 2021. A followup to Talaga's award-winning 2017 book Seven Fallen Feathers: Racism, Death and Hard Truths in a Northern City, the film updates the story of the deaths of several indigenous teenagers in Thunder Bay, Ontario, centring in part on the effects of their deaths on surviving family members.

The film premiered at the 2021 Hot Docs Canadian International Documentary Festival, where it won the Audience Award in the mid-length film category. It was subsequently acquired for theatrical distribution by Blue Ant Media.

References

2021 films
2021 documentary films
Canadian documentary films
Documentary films about First Nations
2020s English-language films
2020s Canadian films